Zhu Xuefan (June 12, 1905 – January 17, 1996) was a Chinese male politician, who served as the vice chairperson of the Standing Committee of the National People's Congress.

References 

1905 births
1996 deaths
Politicians from Shanghai
Members of the Revolutionary Committee of the Chinese Kuomintang
Vice Chairpersons of the National People's Congress
Delegates to the 1st National People's Congress
Delegates to the 2nd National People's Congress
Delegates to the 3rd National People's Congress
Members of the Standing Committee of the 2nd Chinese People's Political Consultative Conference
Members of the Standing Committee of the 3rd Chinese People's Political Consultative Conference
Members of the Standing Committee of the 4th Chinese People's Political Consultative Conference